Chaucer in Rome is a play written by John Guare. In part, it is a sequel to House of Blue Leaves, with one character from that play, Ron Shaughnessy, appearing in Chaucer in Rome.

Synopsis
The play is set in Rome during the Holy Year of Jubilee, which is extremely crowded with pilgrims seeking confession and absolution. The plot focuses on Matt, a celebrated painter who resides at the American Academy in Rome with his lover, Sarah, and his best friend, Pete.  Sarah and Pete are both scholars; Pete is analyzing sociopolitical themes in artistic depictions of Christ's fingernails. 

Matt has recently recovered from squamous cell carcinoma, and Pete and Sarah are horrified to discover that Matt's cancer was caused by his deliberate use of carcinogenic chemicals in his paintings of beautiful landscapes, as a political statement on environmental pollution. Meanwhile, Pete's life is complicated by the arrival of his parents, Ron and Dolo. (Ron is a returning character who featured prominently in House of Blue Leaves.) Pete suggests that Matt change mediums, and eventually convinces him to try film. However, when Matt decides that his newest project will be to impersonate a priest and secretly videotape the confessions of pilgrims, the results threaten to drive Pete's already unstable parents over the edge.

Production
Chaucer in Rome premiered at the Williamstown Theatre Festival, running in July and August 1999. Directed by Nicholas Martin, the cast featured Polly Holliday, Bruce Norris, Lee Wilkof and B.D. Wong. The play was produced Off-Broadway at the Lincoln Center Theater Newhouse Theater from May 10, 2001 to July 29, 2001. Directed by Nicholas Martin, the cast featured Jon Tenney (Matt), Polly Holliday (Dolo), Bruce Norris (Pete), Lee Wilkof (Il Dottore, Father Shapiro), Dick Latessa (Ron), and Carrie Preston (Sarah).

References

2001 plays
Plays by John Guare
Plays set in Italy
Plays set in the 21st century
Sequel plays